The Conference Board of the Mathematical Sciences (CBMS) is an umbrella organization of seventeen professional societies in the mathematical sciences in the United States. 
It and its member societies are recognized by the International Mathematical Union as the national mathematical societies for their country.

The CBMS was founded in 1960 as the successor organization to the six-organization Policy Committee for Mathematics (founded by the American Mathematical Society and the Mathematical Association of America as the War Policy Committee in 1942) and the 1958 Conference Organization of the Mathematical Sciences. As well as representing US mathematics at the IMU, it acts as a communication channel between its member societies and the US Government, and coordinates joint projects of its member societies.

Member societies

 AMATYC   American Mathematical Association of Two-Year Colleges
 AMS      American Mathematical Society
 AMTE     Association of Mathematics Teacher Educators
 ASA      American Statistical Association
 ASL      Association for Symbolic Logic
 AWM      Association for Women in Mathematics
 ASSM     Association of State Supervisors of Mathematics
 BBA      Benjamin Banneker Association
 INFORMS  Institute for Operations Research and the Management Sciences
 IMS      Institute of Mathematical Statistics
 MAA      Mathematical Association of America
 NAM      National Association of Mathematicians
 NCSM     National Council of Supervisors of Mathematics
 NCTM     National Council of Teachers of Mathematics
 SIAM     Society for Industrial and Applied Mathematics
 SOA      Society of Actuaries
 TODOS    TODOS: Mathematics for All
 WME      Women and Mathematics Education

References

External links
Conference Board of the Mathematical Sciences

Mathematical societies